English pop may mean or refer to:

 pop music in the English language
 Britpop, the British alternative rock genre
 Hong Kong English pop, the genre including English music from US, UK and Hong Kong